When I Will Become a Giant is a 1979 Soviet comedy-drama directed by Inna Tumanyan.

Cast
 Mikhail Olegovich Yefremov - Petya Kopeykin 
 Liya Akhedzhakova - Juliette Ashotovna (English teacher)
 Inna Ulyanova - Elvira Pavlovna
 Marina Shimanskaya - Lidiya Nikolaevna
 Oleg Yefremov -

References

External links 

1979 comedy-drama films
1979 films
Soviet comedy-drama films
Gorky Film Studio films
1979 comedy films
1979 drama films
Soviet teen films